Minuscule 30 (in the Gregory-Aland numbering), ε 522 (Von Soden) is a Greek minuscule manuscript of the New Testament, written on 313 paper leaves. Palaeographically it has been assigned to the 15th-century. Formerly Colbertinus 4444. It has marginalia.

Description 
The codex contains a complete text of the four Gospels on 313 paper leaves (22.7 cm by 14.9 cm). The text is written in one column per page, 14 lines per page.

There is no another division according to the Ammonian Sections with references to the Eusebian Canons.

Scrivener suggested it was made by the same scribe (George Hermonymus), who copied Minuscule 17 and 70, whose text is much resembles.

Text 
The Greek text of the codex is a representative of the Byzantine text-type. Aland placed it in Category V.

According to the Claremont Profile Method it represents the textual family Kx in Luke 1 and Luke 20. In Luke 10 no profile was made.
It belongs to the textual cluster 17 along with manuscripts 70, 120, 287, 288, and 880.

History 
The manuscript is dated by the INTF to the 15th-century.

The manuscript once belonged to J. B. Hantin, a French numismatic. Bishop Moore in 1706 took this manuscript from Hantin's library. It was added to the list of the New Testament manuscripts by J. J. Wettstein, who gave it the number 30.

It was examined and described by John Mill (Colbertinus 4 for Matthew), Scholz (1794-1852) and Paulin Martin. Scholz found that its text much resembles minuscule 17. C. R. Gregory saw the manuscript in 1884.

It is currently housed at the Bibliothèque nationale de France (Gr. 100) in Paris.

See also 
 List of New Testament minuscules
 Biblical manuscripts
 Textual criticism

References 

Greek New Testament minuscules
15th-century biblical manuscripts
Bibliothèque nationale de France collections